Taypi Qullu (Aymara taypi center, middle, qullu mountain, "center mountain", also spelled Taypi Kkollu) is a  mountain in the Andes of Bolivia. It is located in the Oruro Department, Sajama Province, Turco Municipality, near Junt'u Uta. Taypi Qullu lies northeast of Asu Asuni.

References 

Mountains of Oruro Department